Trimi is both a surname and a given name. Notable people with the name include: 

Arjola Trimi (born 1987), Italian Paralympic swimmer
Egli Trimi (born 1993), Albanian football player
Trimi Makolli (born 1992), Swedish footballer